The Bakhtrioni uprising was a general revolt in the eastern Georgian Kingdom of Kakheti against the political domination of Safavid Persia, in 1659. It is named after the main battle, which took place at the fortress of Bakhtrioni.

In the first half of the 17th century, Kakhetian king Teimuraz I had conducted resistance against his Persian overlords, which culminated in the bloody and devastating years of the mid-1610s; after successfully repelling an expedition sent by Shah Abbas I, Kakheti was invaded once again by the Shah himself in 1616, much of its population massacred or deported. In the following years, Qizilbash lords were appointed as governors of Kakheti, while a large number of Qizilbash tribal folk were relocated to Georgia in order to strengthen the central control. In the early 1630s, the Persians tried to put Kakheti under control of the more submissive Kingdom of Kartli, led by Georgian prince Rostom, a convert to Islam. When such control had been installed, and Teimuraz had fled to Western Georgia, in the 1650s, a policy of colonisation of Kakheti by Qizilbash Turcoman tribes was decided by the Persians, for a number of reasons. One of these reasons was to repopulate this part of the province, while another one was to keep an eye on the restive nobles. Yet another reason was due to the fact that the Safavid possessions in Georgia were geographically close to the Daghestan province. From Daghestan, Lezgian marauders frequently organized raids into parts of the northwestern Safavid domains, including Safavid Georgia. Lastly, it was also decided as a measure against Russia, which had increased its pressure on Daghestan (see also; Russo-Persian War of 1651–1653), a neighboring province of the Georgia province.

The forced installation of the Qizilbash was the immediate motive for the uprising. Kakheti had been divided in two administrative regions: the south-eastern part was under the power of the beglarbeg of Karabakh, the rest under that of Nakhchivan. Up to 80,000 Turcomans migrated to Kakheti. They started building a fortress at Bakhtrioni, and transforming the ancient monastery of Alaverdi into one.

The uprising was, as in 1615, inspired by the main noble families who had remained faithful to Teimuraz I. However, according to Georgian accounts, the mass of the population took part in it, as they were being evicted of their villages and farms by the incomers. The Eristavi Zaal, Duke of Aragvi, one of the main feudal lords in Kakheti, a former supporter of Teimuraz who had made allegiance to Rostom and the Persians in 1648 and thus gained even more power, took the lead of the uprising. Among the leaders were also Bidzina Choloqashvili, Shalva, Eristavi of Ksani, and his brother Elizbar Eristvisshvili. Georgian mountain people, such as the Tushs, the Khevsurians and the Pshavs, also joined the rebellion, under the leadership of Zezva Gaprindauli, Nadir Khosharauli, and Gogolauri.

The Georgian forces, once united, attacked the Turcoman fortresses at Bakhtrioni and Alaverdi and vanquished them. They then defeated Turcoman forces in other places of Kakheti. However, the weak organisation and isolation of the rebels allowed the Persians, now under personal direction of Shah Abbas II, to successfully counter-attack and defeat them.

The Eristavi Zaal was murdered by his own nephews at the order of the shah, and his children sent to the Persian court. Upon those news, Bidzina Choloqashvili, Shalva of Ksani and Elizbar Eristvisshvili asked the shah for forgiveness, but he had them delivered to the tribes that the insurgees had massacred earlier. They were tortured and put to death. They would be canonized by the Georgian Orthodox Church.

Kakheti remained under Persian rule, even if the rebels had succeeded in defeating the Turcomans, who did not remain in the region In 1664, the Persians agreed to have Archil (Shah-Nazar Khan), son of the king/vali of Kartli, installed as king/vali of Kakheti.

The uprising soon entered Georgian collective memory, and many songs and poems were composed about it, while the mountain warriors became well-known folk heroes. The battle at Bakhtrioni, and the heroism of the mountaineers, inspired Vazha-Pshavela his epic poem Bakhtrioni (1892), while Akaki Tsereteli wrote a whole novel about it, Bashi-Achuki.

References

Sources
 
 
 საქართველოს ისტორიის ნარკვევები, ტ. 4, თბ., 1973;
ნარსია გ., ქსე, ტ. 5, გვ. 447, თბ., 1980

Battles involving Georgia (country)
17th-century rebellions
Uprisings of Georgia (country)
Conflicts in 1659
17th century in Georgia (country)
1659 in Asia
Rebellions against Safavid Iran
Battles involving Safavid Iran